Mohammad Hafeez (Punjabi and ; born 17 October 1980) is a former Pakistani international cricketer. Hafeez was a versatile batsman who could bat anywhere in the top 6 and formed part of the bowling attack. He played as a spin bowling all-rounder for the majority of his career and, along with Saeed Ajmal and Shahid Afridi, formed part of one of the best spin attacks in the 2010's . He retired from Test cricket after the third and final match against New Zealand in Abu Dhabi in December 2018, departing the ground for the final time in white clothing to a guard of honour from his teammates. On 3 January 2022, he announced his retirement from all forms of international cricket, ending a career that spanned more than 18 years.

He was the fourth international player to play in the Caribbean Premier League and the first Pakistani player to be named to be chosen for Twenty20 tournament. He is nicknamed "The Professor". The major teams for which he played are Pakistan, Lahore, Lahore Lions, Guyana Amazon Warriors, Kolkata Knight Riders, Sargodha, Sui Gas Corporation of Pakistan. Hafeez scored his test career best of 224 runs against Bangladesh in 2015 at Khulna during the Dan Cake Series.

In August 2018, he was one of the thirty-three players to be awarded a central contract for the 2018–19 season by the Pakistan Cricket Board (PCB). In December 2018, during Pakistan's series against New Zealand, Hafeez announced that he would retire from Test cricket following the conclusion of the tour, to focus on limited-overs cricket. Hafeez said that the time was right to retire from Test cricket and that he was honoured to represent Pakistan in 55 Test matches, including captaining the side.

After a lackluster personal ICC 2019 World Cup campaign albeit a match-winning 84 batting at number 4 against England in the round-robin stage in 2019, he found new life as a T20 specialist for Pakistan and various leagues across the world. This culminated in him being the leading run scorer in T20I cricket in the world in 2020.

Personal life
Having to disrupt his studies because of his professional cricket career, in 2023 he resumed them at the age of 42 by enrolling in the University of Karachi's BS Health Physical Education and Sports Sciences (HPESS) program.

International career

Early years: 2003–2006
Hafeez has played in Bhera and was one of several young all-rounders whom the Pakistani cricket team turned to in order to revitalize their side after their poor display in 2003 World Cup where Pakistan was out from first round. His form with both bat and ball was inconsistent and in late 2003 he was dropped from the Test squad and subsequently from the ODI side. Following strong domestic performances, as well as some consistent showings for the Pakistan A side, he remained on the fringes of a recall in 2004.
Hafeez returned to the ODI side in 2005 and despite poor form with the bat, his bowling performances were impressive. In the 2006 series held in Australia, Hafeez smashed his first century for Pakistan. With Pakistan struggling to find a solid opening pair for the Test side, he was recalled for the tour of England. His return to Test cricket was made at The Oval where he scored a fluent 95. Subsequently, Hafeez retained his place in the Test squad for Pakistan's home series against the West Indies in November of that year. After getting out early despite good starts in the first two Tests, he went on to score his second Test century in the third Test in Karachi.

Recall in 2010 

In 2010 he was recalled for the third ICC World Twenty20 squad. His form was poor scoring only 39 runs and taking only 2 wickets in 6 matches. However he was subsequently selected for the T20Is and the ODIs on Pakistan's 2010 tour of England. He was the second highest Pakistani run scorer in the ODI series producing some solid opening partnerships with Kamran Akmal. Following this good form he was included in the squad that was selected to play South Africa in the UAE and he replaced disgraced skipper Salman Butt as an opening batsman in both Tests, achieving a batting average 32.50. He played in all 5 ODI matches ending up as the top run scorer and he also topped the bowling averages for the series. At the end of 2010 he was also selected for the party that would tour New Zealand and the West Indies and this resulted in him establishing himself as a regular in the Test, ODI and T20 teams.

Rising through ranks
Against India on 18 March 2012 in Bangladesh at Shere Bangla National Stadium, Mirpur at the 2012 Asia Cup, he scored 105 off 113 balls and was involved in a 224 run partnership with Nasir Jamshed, which is the best opening partnership for Pakistan against India in one day internationals. They eclipsed Aamer Sohail and Saeed Anwar's record of 144 runs which was made in 1996. During this innings, Hafeez was forced to run a lot which towards the end was hampering him due to a leg injury. Subsequently, he earned the nickname, the Snake of Sargodha, for his zigzag running pattern between the wickets. He made his 4th ODI century in March 2012 against Bangladesh at Dhaka. He also made his highest test score of 196 against Sri Lanka in the second Test at Colombo in June 2012.

In December 2012, during the tour of Pakistani cricket team in India in 2012–13, he came across as a very different and aggressive batsman and scored so brilliantly and briskly and helped Pakistan to win the first T20I and 2nd ODI with his heroics of brilliant batting and nearly chasing a mountain high target of 191 in the second T20I. His scores were 61 and 55 in first and second T20I respectively and scored 76 runs in the 2nd ODI and sharing an opening stand of 141 with Nasir Jamshed and also bowled economically to help Pakistan win their first ODI series in India since 7 years. In this period, he was considered to be the main all-rounder of Pakistan Cricket team along with Shahid Afridi. He had a great series against Sri Lanka in Dec 2013, where he scored 122 in the first match, 140* in the third and 113* in the fourth match. Thus he became, the second batsman after Zaheer Abbas to score 3 centuries in an ODI series. Hafeez was initially selected in the Pakistan squad for the 2015 World Cup but was ruled out 6 days before the World Cup due to a calf injury. He was replaced by Nasir Jamshed.

For his performances in 2014, he was named in the World ODI XI by ICC.
He was also named in the T20I XI by Cricinfo for his performances in 2013.

On 20 December 2020, he hit his career best T20I score of 99* off 57 balls against New Zealand in their second T20I at Hamilton. On 31 July 2021, he bowled his most economic spell in the T20I against West Indies, giving away 6 runs off his 4 overs.

T20 captaincy record

Captaincy
He was appointed captain of the Pakistan T20 team in May 2012 and vice captain, under Misbah-ul-Haq, of the ODI and Test teams. During the 2012 ICC World Twenty20 in Sri Lanka in September 2012, Pakistan reached the semi-finals where they lost to the home side. After the tournament, there was some controversy with veteran all-rounder Abdul Razzaq who was critical of his non-selection for a number of matches. Hafeez also came into some conflict with the PCB over their view that he adopted a rather unilateral and non-consultative approach while making selection decisions. However, he was supported by the coach Dav Whatmore and both of them emphasised the poor fitness levels of many players. The PCB committee decided that they would subsequently closely monitor Hafeez's performance in this context during the coming tours to India and South Africa.
As a captain, he led Pakistan to victories over South Africa, West Indies and Zimbabwe. He equalled the records of most wins as a Pakistani captain in T20 and most number of away series wins as a Pakistani captain. Under his leadership, Pakistan managed to move up to the second position in the rankings.

He also became the first Pakistani captain to hit three fifties in a row and became Pakistan's leading run scorer in T20s. After Pakistan's exit from the T20 World Championship Hafeez apologized on behalf of his team and stepped down as captain. Imran Khan, Pakistan's former captain criticised this decision and advised Hafeez to stay as captain. His resignation was a rare incident in Pakistan cricket.

Post-captaincy (2016 - present) 
In March 2016, Pakistan's exit from the 2016 ICC World Twenty20 after losing 3 matches caused great controversy in Pakistan, with blame shifting between Waqar Younis as well as many of the players on the team. Hafeez was accused, by Younis, of lying about his knee injury before the T20. He said it could have affected the teams poor performance. Despite bad performance during the T20I world cup 2016 Hafeez was picked for the England tour of 2016 Hafeez was out on 0 several times throughout the test series and during the ODI series in the first match he was out on 11 which then he was dropped for rest of the tour because of bad performance and not fit enough to play. After missing out of international cricket for months in which he missed the West Indies series in the UAE, Hafeez was then picked for the Australia tour 2017 to play the ODI series. As of the first ODI match Hafeez was out on 4. For the second ODI Azhar Ali was ruled out because of injury which promoted Hafeez to captain Pakistan, Hafeez did a very good job as Pakistan won the match and won for the first time in 12 years on Australian soil. Not only that Hafeez's captaincy was appreciated but he also made 72 runs which earned him player of the match. Hafeez was a regular member in Pakistan's triumph in the Champions Trophy 2017 in England

In April 2019, he was named in Pakistan's squad for the 2019 Cricket World Cup. Though, he was named man of the match in Pakistan's second match of the tournament against England for his 62-ball 84 and important wicket of English captain Eoin Morgan, he remained inconsistent for the rest of the tournament with low-strike rate scores of 16, 9, 20, 32, 19 and 27. He didn't do wonders with the ball either with an expensive economy rate of almost 6 per over which was worse than any other Pakistani spinner in the tournament.

In June 2020, he was named in a 29-man squad for Pakistan's tour to England during the COVID-19 pandemic. However, on 23 June 2020, Hafeez was one of seven players from Pakistan's squad to test positive for COVID-19. Hafeez then tested negative the following day, after taking a private test to get a second opinion. On 30 August 2020, in the second T20I against England, Hafeez became the second batsman for Pakistan to score 2,000 runs in T20I cricket. On 10 April 2021, in the first match against South Africa, Hafeez played in his 100th T20I match.

In September 2021, he was named in Pakistan's squad for the 2021 ICC Men's T20 World Cup.

T20 franchise career

IPL career 
Mohammad Hafeez was signed by Kolkata Knight Riders, and played in the inaugural season of the IPL. He scored 64 runs in 8 matches and picked up 1 wicket in the tournament. He did not play in the 2nd edition of IPL due to the tense atmosphere after the 2008 Mumbai attacks.

PSL career 
Hafeez was placed in the Diamond category in the inaugural edition of PSL and was picked ("bought") for US$70,000 by the Peshawar Zalmi side. He left Peshawar Zalmi in 2018 after playing for the franchise for 3 years.  He was picked by Lahore Qalanders for the fourth edition of PSL and was also given the captaincy.

Bangladesh Premier League career 
In December 2015, he was signed by Dhaka Dynamites for the remainder of the 2015 Bangladesh Premier League (BPL). In December 2018, Hafeez joined Rajshahi Kings for the sixth edition of Bangladesh Premier League.

Other leagues 
Mohammad Hafeez played for Wayamba United in 2012 Sri Lanka Premier League.

In January 2014, he was signed by Melbourne Stars as a replacement Lasith Malinga for the reminder of the 2013–14 BBL.

On 3 June 2018, he was selected to play for the Montreal Tigers in the players' draft for the inaugural edition of the Global T20 Canada tournament. In September 2018, he was named in Nangarhar's squad for the first edition of the Afghanistan Premier League tournament. 

He was signed by Edmonton Royals as marquee player in 2nd season of GT20 Canada in July 2019. He replaced Rassie Van Dussen in ST KITTS & NEVIS PATRIOTS team for CPL 2019. He then, signed for Middlesex for 5 matches in August 2019. He joined Middlesex County Cricket Club for the 2019 Vitality Blast, as a replacement for Mujeeb Ur Rahman.

In November 2021, he was selected to play for the Galle Gladiators following the players' draft for the 2021 Lanka Premier League.

In November 2021, he joined Delhi Bulls for the upcoming fifth season of the Abu Dhabi T10 league.

Bowling action
In June 2015, Hafeez was suspended for an illegal arm action. However, he was again selected for the ODI series against Sri Lanka. He proved the value of his comeback by taking 4 for 41 runs and scored a century, which earned him the man of the match award.

In November 2017, ICC suspended Hafeez again for illegal bowling action.

In December 2019, ECB banned Hafeez from bowling in the T20 Blast because of his action.

Commentary career
Hafeez joined the commentary panel for the Peshawar-Quetta exhibition match ahead of the 2023 PSL.

Records and achievements

International centuries
Hafeez has scored 21 centuries (100 or more runs) in Test matches, One Day International (ODI) matches, organized by the International Cricket Council. Hafeez has scored 10 centuries in Test matches and 11 centuries in ODIs.

Test centuries
Hafeez scored his maiden Test century in his second match on 27 August 2003 against Bangladesh. His highest Test score is 224 which was also scored against Bangladesh on 28 April 2015 at Khulna.

ODI centuries
In ODIs, his maiden century came against New Zealand on 29 January 2011 at Christchurch. He scored 115 runs in that match and guided Pakistan to the victory. Up to now, his highest ODI score is 140* which was scored against Sri Lanka on 22 December 2013 at Sharjah. Sri Lanka is being his favorite opponent in ODIs, against them he had scored 4 centuries.

References

External links
 

1980 births
Living people
People from Sargodha District
Punjabi people
Cricketers at the 2007 Cricket World Cup
Cricketers at the 2011 Cricket World Cup
Cricketers at the 2019 Cricket World Cup
Pakistani cricket captains
Pakistan Test cricket captains
Baluchistan Bears cricketers
Dhaka Dominators cricketers
Faisalabad cricketers
Faisalabad Wolves cricketers
Federal Areas cricketers
Guyana Amazon Warriors cricketers
Khulna Tigers cricketers
Kolkata Knight Riders cricketers
Lahore Lions cricketers
Lahore Qalandars cricketers
Melbourne Stars cricketers
Middlesex cricketers
Pakistan One Day International cricketers
Pakistan Test cricketers
Pakistan Twenty20 International cricketers
Pakistani cricketers
Peshawar Zalmi cricketers
Punjab (Pakistan) cricketers
Rajshahi Royals cricketers
Sargodha cricketers
St Kitts and Nevis Patriots cricketers
Sui Northern Gas Pipelines Limited cricketers
Wayamba United cricketers
Southern Punjab (Pakistan) cricketers
Galle Gladiators cricketers
Pakistani cricket commentators